Zeale is a genus of longhorn beetles of the subfamily Lamiinae, containing the following species:

 Zeale dubia Galileo & Martins, 1997
 Zeale nigromaculata (Klug, 1829)
 Zeale scalaris Pascoe, 1866

References

Hemilophini